The secretary of the Senate is an officer of the United States Senate. The secretary supervises an extensive array of offices and services to expedite the day-to-day operations of that body. The office is somewhat analogous to that of the clerk of the United States House of Representatives.

The first secretary was chosen on April 8, 1789, two days after the Senate achieved its first quorum for business at the beginning of the 1st United States Congress. From the start, the secretary was responsible for keeping the minutes and records of the Senate, including the records of senators' election, and for receiving and transmitting official messages to and from the president and the House of Representatives, as well as for purchasing supplies. As the Senate grew to become a major national institution, numerous other duties were assigned to the secretary, whose jurisdiction now encompasses clerks, curators, and computers; disbursement of payrolls; acquisition of stationery supplies; education of the Senate pages; and the maintenance of public records. Today, the secretary coordinates two of the largest technology initiatives in Senate history, both designed to bring state-of-the-art efficiency to management of legislative and financial information. The secretary's responsibilities include both legislative and administrative functions. By agreement of the two parties, the majority leader selects the secretary of the senate, and the election is merely ceremonial.

The current secretary (for the 118th United States Congress) is Sonceria "Ann" Berry.

Legislative functions 
The secretary regularly accompanies the chaplain into the Senate chamber for the opening of the day's session and a seat beside the presiding officer is reserved for the secretary. The secretary examines and signs by every act that has been passed by the Senate. In certain parliamentary circumstances, the secretary may also preside over the Senate. The most recent occurrence was on 28 June 2010, after Senator Robert Byrd of West Virginia, who had been serving as President Pro Tempore died, and Vice President Joseph Biden was absent. On that occasion, Secretary of the Senate Nancy Erickson took the chair briefly until the Senate adopted a resolution to elect Senator Daniel Inouye of Hawaii as the new president pro tempore.

The first secretary took the minutes of Senate proceedings, a function continued today by the journal clerk. After the Congressional Record evolved into an official publication, the secretary came to supervise the Senate's reporters of debates and preparation of the Daily Digest. Among other Senate floor staff who report to the secretary are the parliamentarian, bill clerk, and legislative clerk.

Administrative functions 
The first secretary purchased the quill pens, ink, and parchment needed by eighteenth-century senators. Modern secretaries of the Senate have responsibility for the Senate Stationery Room, a multimillion-dollar retail operation that keeps senators' offices supplied. From the beginning, the secretary served as the Senate's disbursing officer, paying senators their original salary of six dollars a day plus travel expenses. As the Senate grew, a separate financial clerk was appointed under the secretary's jurisdiction.

In recognition of the immediate and historical significance of Senate bills, resolutions, hearings, and reports, the secretary oversees the Office of Printing and Document Services, the Office of Senate Security (which maintains classified documents), the United States Senate Library, the Office of Senate Curator, and the Senate Historical Office. The secretary also maintains the Office of Interparliamentary Services to provide support for those interparliamentary conferences in which the Senate participates and to assist senators in international travel. Also under the secretary's direction, the Office of Public Records collects and makes publicly available documents relating to campaign finance, financial ethics, foreign travel, and lobbying.

In 1789 the secretary was authorized to hire "one principal clerk." This principal clerk, or chief clerk, for many years served primarily as a reading clerk on the Senate floor. But during the 1960s, in response to the secretary's growing administrative duties, the position evolved into that of assistant secretary of the Senate, who oversees the administration of the Secretary's Office, including computers and the secretary's web site. The assistant secretary also performs the functions of the secretary in his or her absence. During the 1960s, under the leadership of Francis R. Valeo, staff positions under the secretary of the Senate were redefined from patronage to professional status, a trend continued by Valeo's successors.

Some notable secretaries
A position of great trust and responsibility, the Senate secretaryship has been held by a long line of distinguished individuals. Samuel Allyne Otis, the first secretary of the Senate, had previously been speaker of the Massachusetts legislature and a member of the Continental Congress. Otis held the post of secretary for twenty-five years, never missing a day that the Senate was in session. General Anson McCook of New York, a former House member and one of the "Fighting McCooks" of the Civil War, served as secretary, as well as a former Confederate general and Congressman, William R. Cox of North Carolina. In addition, two former U.S. senators, Charles Cutts of New Hampshire and Walter Lowrie of Pennsylvania, have later served as secretary. Other former House members who have held the post include Charles G. Bennett (NY). During the Ninety-ninth Congress (1985–1987), Jo-Anne Coe became the first woman to serve as secretary. 

It has not been unusual for secretaries of the Senate to have devoted their entire careers to the Senate. Several began as pages, including Edwin Halsey, who served throughout the dramatic New Deal years; Leslie Biffle, a close confidant of President Harry S. Truman; Carl Loeffler and J. Mark Trice, secretaries during the Eightieth and Eighty-third congresses; and Walter J. Stewart, secretary from 1987 to 1994.

Secretaries of the Senate

See also
Clerk of the Parliaments
Clerk of the Senate (Canada)
Clerk of the Australian Senate
Secretary General of the Rajya Sabha (India)

References

External links
 Secretary of the Senate, officers of the U.S. Senate